Frederick Campbell may refer to:

Lord Frederick Campbell (1729–1816), Scottish nobleman
Frederick Campbell, 3rd Earl Cawdor (1847–1911), British politician
Frederick William Campbell (genealogist) (1782–1846), Scottish genealogist
Frederick F. Campbell (born 1943), American Roman Catholic bishop
Fred Campbell (Australian footballer) (born 1979), Australian rules footballer
Fred Campbell (English footballer)
Frederick George Campbell (1853–1929), American sheep breeder and rancher
Fred Campbell (basketball) (1920–2008), American basketball player and coach
Fred Campbell (Australian politician) (1911–1995), member of the Queensland Legislative Assembly

Military
Frederick William Campbell (1867–1915), Canadian recipient of the Victoria Cross
Frederick Campbell (British Army officer, born 1780) (1780–1866), general in the British Army
Frederick Campbell (British Army officer, born 1860) (1860–1943), general in the British Army

See also
 Henry Frederick Campbell General Sir Henry Frederick Campbell, ( 1769 – 1856)